Majid Jahangir Khan (Punjabi, ; born September 28, 1946), nicknamed  "Majestic Khan" by the British press, is a former cricketer, batsman and captain of the Pakistan national cricket team. In his heyday, he was considered to be one of the best batsmen in the world.  Khan has a claim as the best ever opening batsman against express pace, averaging over 50 each in test matches and World Cups when opening against the fearsome pace attacks of the 1970s West Indies and Australia, with all but 2 of these matches played away from home. In his first class cricket career spanning 18 years, from 1961 to 1985, Majid Khan played in 63 Test matches for Pakistan, scoring 3,931 runs with 8 centuries, scored over 27,000 first-class runs and made 73 first-class centuries, with 128 fifties. Majid played his last Test for Pakistan in January 1983 against India at Gaddafi Stadium, Lahore and his last One Day International (ODI) was in July 1982 against England at Old Trafford, Manchester.

Early life 
Born on 28 September 1946 in Ludhiana, Punjab, British India to a Burki Pashtun family, Khan grew up in Lahore, the capital of the Punjab province of Pakistan. His father, Jahangir Khan, had played Test cricket for India before the Partition of India in 1947. He is a cousin of former Pakistani Prime Minister Imran Khan, who was also a former captain of the Pakistan national cricket team before entering politics. Majid Khan started his career as a pace bowler, but a back injury and doubts over his technique converted him into an off-spin bowler and batsman. He also played for Glamorgan and Cambridge University in Britain, for Queensland in Australia, and in Pakistan for Pakistan International Airlines, Rawalpindi, Lahore and the province of Punjab.

Majid's father, Dr. Jahangir Khan, famously killed a bird in flight while bowling during an MCC vs. Cambridge University match in 1936. This bird is now part of the permanent MCC museum exhibit at Lord's Cricket ground. Dr. Jahangir Khan was the Chief Selector of then Board of Control for Cricket in Pakistan (BCCP) when Majid Khan was close to national selection. Dr. Jahangir Khan resigned from his post to maintain the impartiality of the Cricket Board during selection.

International career 
In 1964, Majid's Test career started against Australia at National Stadium, Karachi. Majid Khan is one of only six batsmen (the other five are Trumper, Macartney, Bradman, Warner and Shikhar Dhawan), to have scored a century before lunch on the first day of a test match, scoring 108 not-out off 78 balls against New Zealand in Karachi during the 1976–77 test series. Khan made his ODI debut against New Zealand in 1973 at Lancaster Park, New Zealand. He also holds the unique honour of scoring the first one-day century for Pakistan, in an ODI against England at Trent Bridge on 31 August 1974. Khan scored 109 from 93 balls with 16 fours and a six, leading Pakistan to victory.

Majid had played for Lahore since 1961–62 and had made his Test debut against Australia in 1964–65 and toured England and Wales with the 1967 Pakistanis. During a match with Glamorgan, Majid blasted a rapid 147 in 89 minutes, hitting Roger Davis for five sixes in one over. Wilf Wooller, the club secretary, had been a close friend of Majid's father when Dr Jahangir Khan had been up at Cambridge, and the influential Glamorgan secretary persuaded Glamorgan county to sign him as the overseas player from 1968. In 1972 he won the Walter Lawrence Trophy for the season's fastest century which he scored in 70 minutes for Glamorgan against Warwickshire. He captained the Welsh county between 1973 and 1976, scored over 9000 runs punctuated with 21 first-class centuries for them. Imran Khan, the legendary Pakistani ex-captain and fast bowler, and Javed Burki are his cousins. Bazid Khan, Majid's son, has also played for Pakistan, making the family the second, after the Headleys, to have three consecutive generations of Test cricketers.

Initially, Majid Khan continued to boost Pakistan's middle order until he was promoted to fill the opener's slot with Sadiq Mohammad in 1974. He was the first century scorer for Pakistan in One Day International Cricket, scoring 109 runs against England at Trent Bridge, Nottingham in the same season. Majid Khan was also a specialist slip fielder and made most catches look easy. Khan was also well known as a "walker", maintaining the standards of the game in an era when professionalism was straining at the game's traditional etiquette.

The 1976–77 tour of West Indies was the most remarkable period for Majid Khan, where he scored 530 Test runs against one of the most powerful bowling attacks in the history of the game. His best innings was perhaps the 167 in Pakistan's second innings at Georgetown that saved Pakistan from likely defeat. Pakistan lost that series 2–1.

After retirement from International Cricket, Khan became an administrator with the Pakistan Cricket Board, becoming the CEO of the board in the mid-1990s. He was the Chief Selector for Pakistan in 1993. He officiated the Australia and West Indies Test series in 1995 as a match-referee. He was the Chief Executive of the Pakistan Board but resigned after levelling match-fixing allegations against the Pakistan team in the 1999 World Cup. His claims were backed by Sarfraz Nawaz at the time but led to no prosecutions. He now lives in Islamabad.

Bibliography 
Zahid Zia Cheema, Mighty Khan : a tribute to Majid Khan (1996, 2008)

References

External links 
 
 

1946 births
Living people
Aitchison College alumni
Pakistan One Day International cricketers
Pakistan Test cricketers
Pakistan Test cricket captains
Pakistani cricket captains
Alumni of Emmanuel College, Cambridge
Cambridge University cricketers
Glamorgan cricketers
Glamorgan cricket captains
World Series Cricket players
Cricketers at the 1975 Cricket World Cup
Cricketers at the 1979 Cricket World Cup
Wisden Cricketers of the Year
Cricketers from Ludhiana
Queensland cricketers
Pashtun people
Pakistani cricketers
People from Islamabad
Lahore cricketers
Lahore A cricketers
Lahore Greens cricketers
Punjab University cricketers
Pakistan Universities cricketers
Pakistan International Airlines cricketers
Punjab (Pakistan) cricketers
Lahore City cricketers
Punjab A cricketers
Central Zone (Pakistan) cricketers
Pakistan Eaglets cricketers
Rawalpindi cricketers
Majid
Oxford and Cambridge Universities cricketers
St. Anthony's High School, Lahore alumni
Pakistani cricket administrators